Machaerina (twigrush) is a genus of flowering plants in the sedge family. Its species occur in tropical America, the West Indies, Malesia, Australia and the Pacific region. The name comes from the Greek machaira (a large knife), alluding to the shape of the leaves in the type species – Machaerina restioides.

Description
The species in the genus are rhizomatous perennials. The leaves are mainly basal, with a few cauline, laterally compressed, distichous and equitant at base. The culms are tufted and pithy. The inflorescence consists of several partial panicles. The flowers may be bisexual or male.

Species
Described species include:

Machaerina acuta (Labill.) J.Kern 
Machaerina anceps (Poir.) Bojer
Machaerina angustifolia (Gaudich.) T.Koyama
Machaerina arthrophylla (Nees) T.Koyama
Machaerina articulata (R.Br.) T.Koyama
Machaerina aspericaulis (Kük.) T.Koyama
Machaerina austrobrasiliensis M.T.Strong
Machaerina ayangannensis M.T.Strong
Machaerina bidwellii (Stapf ex Setch.) T.Koyama
Machaerina complanata (Berggr.) T.Koyama
Machaerina cubensis (Kük.) T.Koyama
Machaerina deplanchei (Boeckeler) T.Koyama
Machaerina disticha (C.B.Clarke) T.Koyama
Machaerina ekmanii (Kük.) T.Koyama
Machaerina ensifolia (Boeckeler) T.Koyama
Machaerina ensigera (Hance) T.Koyama
Machaerina falcata (Nees) T.Koyama
Machaerina ficticia (Hemsl.) T.Koyama
Machaerina filifolia Griseb.
Machaerina flexuosa (Boeckeler) J.Kern
Machaerina glomerata (Gaudich.) T.Koyama
Machaerina gunnii (Hook.f.) J.Kern
Machaerina hirta Boeckeler
Machaerina huttonii (Kirk) T.Koyama
Machaerina insularis (Benth.) T.Koyama
Machaerina involuta H.St.John
Machaerina iridifolia (Bory) T.Koyama
Machaerina juncea (R.Br.) T.Koyama
Machaerina lamii (Kük.) J.Kern
Machaerina lavarum (Poir.) Bojer
Machaerina laxa (Nees) T.Koyama
Machaerina maingayi (C.B.Clarke) T.Koyama
Machaerina mariscoides (Gaudich.) J.Kern
Machaerina milnei (C.B.Clarke) T.Koyama
Machaerina montana (J.Raynal) Lye
Machaerina monticola (Guillaumin) T.Koyama
Machaerina muelleri (C.B.Clarke) T.Koyama
Machaerina myriantha (Chun & F.C.How) Y.C.Tang
Machaerina nuda (Steud.) J.Kern
Machaerina nukuhivensis (F.Br.) T.Koyama
Machaerina preissii (Nees) L.A.S.Johnson & Koyama
Machaerina raiateensis (J.W.Moore) S.L.Welsh
Machaerina restioides (Sw.) Vahl
Machaerina riparia (Nees) T.Koyama
Machaerina rubiginosa (Spreng.) T.Koyama
Machaerina scirpoidea (Steud.) T.Koyama
Machaerina sinclairii (Hook.f.) T.Koyama
Machaerina tenax (Hook.f.) T.Koyama
Machaerina teretifolia (R.Br.) T.Koyama
Machaerina tetragona (Labill.) T.Koyama
Machaerina vaginalis (Benth.) T.Koyama

References

 
Cyperaceae genera